Kuri language may refer to:

One of the Yuin–Kuric languages, mainly extinct Australian Aboriginal languages
Kuri language (Austronesian), of New Guinea
Kuri language (Chadic), a dialect of Yedina language
Kuri-Dou language, of Brazil